This is a list of fossil genera of foraminiferans.

A

Abadehella
Abathomphalus
Abditodentrix
Abdullaevia
Abrardia
Abyssamina
Acarinina
Accordiella
Acervoschwagerina
Acervulina
Aciculella
Acostina
Acruliammina
Actinocyclina
Actinosiphon
Adelosina
Adelungia
Adercotryma
Adhaerentia
Adraheutina
Aeolisaccus
Aeolostreptis
Affinetrina
Afghanella
Afrobolivina
Agathammina
Agathamminoides
Agglutinella
Agglutisolena
Akiyoshiella
Aktinorbitoides
Alabamina
Alabaminoides
Aleomorphella
Alfredina
Alliatina
Alliatinella
Allomorphina
Allomorphinella
Almaena
Alpillina
Alpinophragmium
Altasterella
Altinerina
Altistoma
Alveocyclammina
Alveolina
Alveolinella
Alveolophragmium
Alveosepta
Alveovalvulina
Alzonella
Ambitropus
Amijiella
Ammoastuta
Ammobacularia
Ammobaculites
Ammobaculoides
Ammocycloculina
Ammodiscella
Ammodiscoides
Ammodiscus
Ammoelphidiella
Ammoglobigerina
Ammogloborotalia
Ammolagena
Ammomarginulina
Ammonia
Ammopalmula
Ammoscalaria
Ammosiphonia
Ammosphaeroidina
Ammospirata
Ammotium
Ammotrochoides
Ammovertella
Ammovertellina
Ammovolummina
Amphicervicis
Amphicoryna
Amphimorphina
Amphisorus
Amphistegina
Amphitremoida
Amphoratheca
Amplectoproductina
Anaticinella
Anchispirocyclina
Andamookia
Andersenia
Andersenolina
Andrejella
Androsina
Angotia
Angulodiscus
Angulogavelinella
Angulogerina
Anictosphaera
Annectina
Annulocibicides
Annulofrondicularia
Annulopatellina
Anomalinella
Anomalinoides
Antalyna
Antarcticella
Apertauroria
Apterrinella
Aragonella
Aragonia
Arakaevella
Archaealveolina
Archaecyclus
Archaediscus
Archaeglobigerina
Archaeochintinia
Archaeochitosa
Archaeosepta
Archaesphaera
Archaias
Archiacina
Arenagula
Areniconulus
Arenobulimina
Arenodosaria
Arenogaudryina
Arenonionella
Arenoparrella
Arenosiphon
Arenoturrispirillina
Arenovidalina
Armenina
Arnaudiella
Articularia
Articulina
Asanoina
Asanonella
Asanospira
Aschemocella
Ascoliella
Asselodiscus
Assilina
Astacolus
Asterigerina
Asterigerinata
Asterigerinella
Asterigerinoides
Asteroammonia
Asteroarchaediscus
Asterocyclina
Asterohedbergella
Asterolepidina
Asterophragmina
Asterorbis
Asterorotalia
Astrononion
Astrorhiza
Astrorotalia
Asymmetrina
Atactolituola
Ataxoorbignyna
Ataxophragmium
Atelikamara
Atwillina
Aubignyna
Audienusina
Auloconus
Aulotortus
Auroria
Austrocolomiá
Austrotrillina
Avesnella
Awhea
Axiopolina
Ayalaina

B

Babelispirillina
Baculogypsina
Baculogypsinoides
Baelenia
Baggatella
Baggina
Bagginoides
Baisalina
Baituganella
Balkhania
Bandyella
Banffella
Bannerella
Barbourinella
Barkerina
Barnardina
Bartramella
Bathysiphon
Bdelloidina
Beedeina
Beella
Belorussiella
Berggrenia
Bermudezella
Bermudezina
Bermudezinella
Berthelina
Berthelinella
Berthelinopsis
Biapertorbis
Biarritzina
Biasterigerina
Bibradya
Biconcava
Bifarilaminella
Bifarina
Bifarinella
Bifurcammina
Bigenerina
Biglobigerinella
Bilingulogavelinella
Biloculinella
Bimonilina
Biokovina
Biorbis
Biparietata
Biplanata
Biplanispira
Bireophax
Biseriammina
Biseriella
Bisphaera
Bispiranella
Bitaxia
Biticinella
Bituberitina
Bitubulogenerina
Biwaella
Blastammina
Blefuscuiana
Blowiella
Bogushella
Bojarkaella
Boldia
Bolivina
Bolivinella
Bolivinellina
Bolivinita
Bolivinoides
Bolivinopsis
Bolkarina
Bolliella
Boltovskoyella
Borelis
Boreloides

Bosniella
Boultonia
Bozorginiella
Brachysiphon
Bradyina
Bramkampella
Brasiliella
Brebina
Brenckleina
Brevaxina
Brizalina
Broeckina
Broeckinella
Bronnimannia
Brunsia
Brunsiella
Bucella
Buccicrenata
Bucherina
Buchnerina
Budashevaella
Bueningia
Bulbobaculites
Bulbobuccicrenata
Bulbophragmium
Bulimina
Buliminella
Buliminellita
Buliminoides
Bullalveolina
Bullopora
Burseolina
Buzasina
Bykovaeina
Bykoviella

C

Calcarina
Calcitornella
Calcivertella
Caligella
Calveziconus
Calvezina
Camagueyia
Campanellula
Cancellina
Cancris
Cancrisiella
Candeina
Candorbulina
Carbonella
Caribeanella
Carinoconus
Carixia
Carpentaria
Carterina
Caspiella
Cassidelina
Cassidella
Cassidulina
Cassidulinella
Cassidulinita
Cassidulinoides
Cassigerinella
Cassigerinelloita
Cataspydrax
Caucasina
Caudriella
Cellonina
Ceratammina
Ceratobulimina
Ceratocancris
Ceratolamarckina
Cerobertina
Cerobertinella
Chablaisia
Chalaroschwagerina
Chalilovella
Chapmanina
Charentia
Charltonina
Chenella
Chenia
Chernobaculites
Chernyshinella
Chernyshinellina
Chiloguembelina
Chiloguembelitria
Chilostomella
Chilostomelloides
Chilostomina
Chitinodendron
Chitinolagena
Chitralina
Choffatella
Chomatomediocris
Chrysalidina
Chrysalidinella
Chrysalogonium
Chrysothurammina
Chubbina
Chusenella
Cibicides
Cibicidina
Cibicidoides
Cibicorbis
Cincoriola
Ciperozea
Circinatiella
Cisalveolina
Citharina
Citharinella
Civrieuxia
Claudostriatella
Clavatorella
Clavelloides
Clavigerinella
Clavihedbergella
Claviticinella
Clavulina
Clavulinoides
Clavulinopsis
Climacammina
Clinapertina
Clypeorbis
Cocoarota
Codonofusiella
Colania
Colaniella
Coleiconus
Coleites
Colomia
Colomita
Colonammina
Comaliamma
Compressigerina
Concavatotruncana
Concavella
Condonofusiella
Condrustella
Conicorbitolina
Conicospirillina
Conilites
Conoglobigerina
Conolagena
Conorbina
Conorbinella
Conorbitoides
Conorboides
Conorotalites
Conotrochammina
Contusotruncana
Coprolithina
Cordatella
Cornuloculina
Cornuspira
Coronipora
Corrigotubella
Corrosina
Corrugatella
Coryphostoma
Coscinophragma
Coscinospira
Coskinolina
Coskinolinoides
Coskinon
Costayella
Costellagerina
Costifera
Coxites
Crenatella
Crenaverneuilina
Crenulostomina
Crespinella
Crespinina
Cribellopsis
Cribranopsis
Cribratina
Cribroaperturata
Cribroelphidium
Cribrogenerina
Cribrogloborotalia
Cribrogoesella
Cribrohantkenina
Cribrohemisphaeroides
Cribrolenticulina
Cribrolinoides
Cribronodosaria
Cribrononion
Cribroparrella
Cribropleurostomella
Cribropullenia
Cribrorobulina
Cribrorotalia
Cribrosphaeroides
Cribrospira
Cribrostomoides
Cribroturretoides
Cristellariopsis
Croneisella
Cruciloculina
Cryptoseptida
Ctenorbitoides
Cubanina
Cuburbita
Cuneolina
Cuneolinella
Cuneus
Cuniculinella
Cursina
Cushmania
Cushmanina
Cuvillierina
Cyclammina
Cycledomia
Cyclindroclavulina
Cycloclypeus
Cycloforina
Cyclolina
Cycloloculina
Cyclopseudedomia
Cyclopsinella
Cycloputeolina
Cyclorbiculina
Cyclorbiculinoides
Cyclorbitopsella
Cylindroclavulina
Cylindrocolaniella
Cylindrotrocholina
Cymbalopora
Cymbaloporella
Cymbaloporetta
Cystammina

D

Dagmarella
Dagmarita
Dainella
Dainita
Dainitella
Daixina
Danubiella
Dariellina
Dariopsidae
Darjella
Darvasites
Daucina
Daucinoides
Daviesiconus
Daviesina
Daxia
Debarina
Deckerella
Deckerellina
Demirina
Dendritina
Dendrophyra
Dentalina
Dentalinella
Dentalinoides
Dentalinopsis
Dentoglobigerina
Derventina
Deuterospira
Dhrumella
Dictyoconella
Dictyoconoides
Dictyoconus
Dictyokathina
Dictyopsella
Dictyopselloides
Dictyorbitolina
Dicyclina
Dimorphina
Diplosphaerina
Diplotremina
Discamminoides
Discanomalina
Discocyclina
Discogypsina
Discoramulina
Discorbinella
Discorbis
Discorbitina
Discorbitura
Discorinopsis
Discorotalia
Discospirina
Dizerina
Dobrogelina
Dogielina
Dohaia
Dolosella
Dorothia
Drepaniota
Drevennia
Droogerinella
Dryorhizopsis
Dukhania
Dunbarinella
Dunbarula
Duostomina
Duotaxis
Duplella
Dutkevichella
Dutkevichites
Dutkevitchia
Dyfrondicularia
Dymia
Dyocibicides

E

Earlandia
Earlandinella
Earlandinita
Eblanaia
Echigoina
Echinoporina
Eclusia
Econgella
Edhemia
Edithaella
Edomia
Eggerella
Eggerellina
Eggerina
Ehrenbergina
Elenella
Elergella
Elhasaella
Ellipsobulimina
Ellipsocristellaria
Ellipsodimorphina
Ellipsoglandulina
Ellipsoidella
Ellipsoidina
Ellipsolingulina
Ellipsopolymorphina
Elongobula
Elphidiella
Elphidioides
Elphidium
Enantiomorphina
Enatiodentalina
Endochernella
Endospiroplectammina
Endostaffella
Endoteba
Endotebanella
Endothyra
Endothyranella
Endothyranopsis
Endotriada
Endotriadella
Eoammosphaeroides
Eoannularia
Eoclavatorella
Eoconuloides
Eocristellaria
Eoendothyra
Eoendothyranopsis
Eoeponidella
Eofabiania
Eoforschia
Eofusulina
Eoglobigerina
Eoguttulina
Eohastigerinella
Eolagena
Eolasiodiscus
Eomarssonella
Eonodosaria
Eoophthalmidium
Eopalorbitolina
Eoparafusulina
Eopolydiexodina
Eoquasiendothyra
Eorupertia
Eoschubertella
Eosigmoilina
Eostaffella
Eostaffeloides
Eotextularia
Eotournayella
Eotuberitina
Eouvigerina
Eoverbeekina
Eovolutina
Eowaeringella
Eowedekindellina
Eozellia
Epiannularia
Epistomaria
Epistomina
Epistominella
Epistominita
Epistominitella
Epistominoides
Epithemella
Eponidella
Eponides
Escornebovina
Eubuliminella
Eulepidina
Eulinderina
Euloxostomum
Eurycheilostoma
Euuvigerina
Euxinita
Everticyclammina
Evlania
Evolutinella
Evolutononion
Evolvocassidulina
Exsculptina
Eygalierina

F

Fabiania
Fabularia
Fallotella
Fallotia
Falsocibicides
Falsogaudryinella
Falsoguttulina
Falsopalmula
Falsoplanulina
Falsotruncana
Falsurgonina
Faujasina
Favocassidulina
Favulina
Favusella
Felsinella
Ferayina
Feurtillia
Fijnonion
Finlayina
Fischerina
Fissoelphidium
Fissurina
Flabellammina
Flabellamminopsis
Flabellinella
Flabellocyclolina
Flagrospira
Flectospira
Flintinella
Flosculinella
Flourensina
Fontbotia
Forschia
Forschiella
Francesita
Freixialina
Frondicularia
Frondiculinata
Frondilina
Frondina
Frondovaginulina
Frumentella
Fursenkoina
Fusarchaias
Fusiella
Fusulina
Fusulinella

G

Gabonita
Galeanella
Galliherina
Gallitellia
Gallowaiina
Galwayella
Gandinella
Ganella
Gansserina
Garantella
Gastroammina
Gaudryina
Gaudryinella
Gaudryinoides
Gaudryinopsis
Gavelinella
Gavelinopsis
Geinitzina
Gemellides
Geminospira
Gendrotella
Gerkeina
Gheorghianina
Gigasbia
Giraliarella
Glabratella
Glabratellina
Glandulina
Glandulinoides
Glandulopleurostomella
Globanomalina
Globicuniculus
Globigerapsis
Globigerina
Globigerinatella
Globigerinatheka
Globigerinella
Globigerinelloides
Globigerinita
Globigerinoides
Globigerinoidesella
Globigerinoita
Globigerinopsis
Globigerinopsoides
Globimorphina
Globispiroplectamminha
Globivalvulina
Globobulimina
Globocassidulina
Globochernella
Globoconusa
Globoendothyra
Globofissurella
Globoquadrina
Globoreticulina
Globorosalina
Globorotalia
Globorotalites
Globorotaloides
Globospirillina
Globotetrataxis
Globotruncana
Globotruncanella
Globotruncanita
Globoturborotalita
Globuligerina
Globulina
Globulospinella
Glomalveolina
Glomodiscus
Glomospira
Glomospiranella
Glomospirella
Glomospiroides
Glomotrocholina
Glubokoevella
Glyphostomella
Goesella
Gonatosphaera
Gorbachikella
Gorisella
Goupillaudina
Granuliferella
Granuliferelloides
Gravellina
Grigelis
Grillina
Grillita
Grimsdaleinella
Gsollbergella
Gubkinella
Gublerina
Guembelitria
Guembelitriella
Guembelitrioides
Gunteria
Guppyella
Gutnicella
Guttulina
Gypsina
Gyroconulina
Gyroidina
Gyroidinella
Gyroidinoides
Gyrovalvulina

H

Haddonia
Haerella
Haeuslerella
Hagenowella
Hagenowina
Haimasiella
Halenia
Halkyardia
Hanostaffella
Hansenisca
Hantkenina
Hanzawaia
Haoella
Haplophragmella
Haplophragmina
Haplophragmium
Haplophragmoides
Hastigerina
Hastigerinella
Hastigerinoides
Hastigerinopsis
Hauerina
Haurania
Hayasakaina
Haynesina
Hechtina
Hedbergella
Hedraites
Helentappanella
Helicolepidina
Helicorbitoides
Helicostegina
Helicosteginopsis
Hellenocyclina
Helvetoglobatruncana
Hemicyclammina
Hemidiscus
Hemifusulina
Hemifusulinella
Hemirobulina
Hemisphaerammina
Hemithurammina
Hemlebenia
Hensonia
Hensonina
Hergottella
Heronallenia
Heterantyx
Heterillina
Heterocoskinolina
Heterohelix
Heterolepa
Heteromorphina
Heterostegina
Heterostomella
Hidaella
Hidina
Hiltermannella
Hippocrepina
Hippocrepinella
Hirsutospirella
Histopomphus
Historbitoides
Hoeglundina
Hofkerina
Hofkeruva
Holkeria
Hollandina
Holmanella
Homalohedra
Homotrema
Hopkinsina
Hopkinsinella
Hormosina
Hormosinella
Hospitella
Hottingerella
Hottingerina
Hottingerita
Howchinella
Howchinia
Hoyenella
Hubeiella
Hyalinea
Hyalinonetrion
Hyderia
Hydrania
Hyperammina
Hyperamminita
Hyperamminoides
Hyperbathoides

I

Ichthyolaria
Idalina
Igorina
Ilerdorbis
Illigata
Inaequalina
Inauris
Inflatobolivinella
Inordinatosphaera
Insculptarenula
Insolentitheca
Involutaria
Involutina
Involvina
Iowanella
Iraqia
Irenita
Irregularina
Islandiella
Ismailia
Istriloculina
Iuliusina
Ivanovella
Ivdelina

J

Jaculella
Jadammina
Janischewskina
Jarvisella
Jascottella
Jurella

K

Kaeveria
Kahlerina
Kalamopsis
Kalosha
Kamurana
Kanakaia
Kangvarella
Kansanella
Karaburunia
Karaisella
Karreria
Karreriella
Karrerotextularia
Kasachstanodiscus
Kassabiana
Kathina
Kechenotiske
Keramosphaerina
Kerionammina
Kettnerammina
Kilianina
Klamathina
Klubonibelia
Klubovella
Kolchidina
Kolesnikovella
Korobkovella
Koskinobigenerina
Koskinotextularia
Krikoumbilica
Kuglerina
Kunklerina
Kurnubia
Kutsevella
Kwantoella
Kyphopyxa

L

Labiostoma
Labyrinthidoma
Labyrinthina
Labyrinthochitinia
Lacazina
Lacazinella
Lacosteina
Laculatina
Ladoronia
Laevidentalina
Laevipeneroplis
Laffitteina
Lagena
Lagenammina
Lagenoglandulina
Lagnea
Lamarckella
Lamarckina
Lamarmorella
Lamelliconus
Laminononion
Langenosolenia
Lankesterina
Lantschichites
Larrazetia
Lasiodiscus
Lasiotrochus
Laterostomella
Latibolivina
Laticarinina
Latiendothyra
Latiendothyranopsis
Laxoendothyra
Laxoseptabrunsiina
Leella
Lenticulina
Lenticulinella
Lepidocyclina
Lepidorbitoides
Lepidosemicyclina
Leptotriticites
Lernella
Leupoldina
Liebusella
Lilliputianella
Linaresia
Linderina
Lingulina
Lingulogavelinella
Lingulonodosaria
Lipinella
Lipinellina
Lippsina
Lituola
Lituolipora
Lituonelloides
Lituotuba
Lituotubella
Lobatula
Lockhartia
Loeblichia
Loftusia
Loisthostomata
Longiapertina
Louisettita
Loxostomina
Loxostomoides
Loxostomum
Lugtonia
Lunatriella
Lunucammina
Lysella

M

Magnesoina
Maichelina
Makarskiana
Maklaya
Mandjina
Mandorovella
Manorella
Marginara
Marginopora
Marginotruncana
Marginulina
Marginulinita
Marginulinopsis
Marieita
Marsipella
Marssonella
Martiguesia
Martinottiella
Maslinella
Massilina
Matanzia
Maylisoria
Mayncina
Mccloudia
Meandroloculina
Meandropsina
Meandrospira
Meandrospiranella
Mediocris
Mediopsis
Medipsia
Medocia
Megastomella
Meidamonella
Melathrokerion
Melatolla
Melonis
Merlingina
Mesammina
Mesodentalina
Mesoendothyra
Mesorbitolina
Mesoschubertella
Metadoliolina
Metapolymorphina
Meyendorffina
Migros
Mikhailovella
Miliammina
Miliola
Miliolechina
Miliolinella
Miliolipora
Miliospirella
Millerella
Miniacina
Miniuva
Minojapanella
Minouxia
Minyaichme
Miogypsina
Miogypsinita
Miogypsinoides
Miolepidocyclina
Miosorites
Mirifica
Mironovella
Miscellanea
Misellina
Mississippina
Moesiloculina
Moncharmontia
Monodiexodina
Monotaxinoides
Monspeliensina
Montfortella
Montiparus
Montsechiana
Mooreinella
Moravammina
Morozovella
Mstinia
Mstiniella
Mucronina
Mufushanella
Multifidella
Multiseptida
Multispirina
Murciella
Murgeina
Murgella
Muricoglobigerina
Murrayinella
Mychostomina

N

Nagatoella
Nanicella
Nankinella
Nanlingella
Narayania
Naupliella
Nautiloculina
Navarella
Neaguites
Neoacarinina
Neoarchaediscus
Neoarchaesphaera
Neobrunsiina
Neobulimina
Neocarpenteria
Neoclavulina
Neocribrella
Neodiscocyclina
Neoeponides
Neoflabellina
Neofusulina
Neofusulinella
Neogloboquadrina
Neogyroidina
Neoiraqia
Neolenticulina
Neomisellina
Neoparadainella
Neoplanorbulinella
Neorbitolinopsis
Neorotalia
Neoschubertella
Neoschwagerina
Neostaffella
Neothailandina
Neouvigenna
Nephrolepidina
Nephrosphaera
Nevillella
Nezzazata
Nezzazatinella
Nikitinella
Ninella
Nipponitella
Nodasperodiscus
Nodellum
Nodobacularia
Nodobaculariella
Nodobolivinella
Nodochernyshinella
Nodogenerina
Nodogordiospira
Nodoinvolutaria
Nodomorphina
Nodophthalmidium
Nodosarchaediscus
Nodosarella
Nodosaria
Nodosinella
Nodosinelloides
Nonion
Nonionella
Nonionelleta
Nonionellina
Norcottia
Nothia
Notoconorbina
Notoplanulina
Notorotalia
Nouria
Novalesia
Novella
Nubecularia
Nudarchaediscus
Nummodiscorbis
Nummofallotia
Nummoloculina
Nummulite
Nuttallides
Nuttallinella
Nuttallus

O

Oberhauserella
Obliquina
Obsoletes
Occidentoschwagerina
Oketaella
Olssonina
Omphalocyclus
Omphalotis
Oolina
Oolitella
Operculina
Opertorbitolites
Opertum
Ophthalmidium
Ophthalmipora
Orbignyna
Orbitammina
Orbitoclypeus
Orbitocyclina
Orbitoides
Orbitokathina
Orbitolina
Orbitolinella
Orbitolinopsis
Orbitolites
Orbitopsella
Orbulina
Orbulinoides
Orcadia
Ordovicina
Oridorsalis
Orientina
Orietalia
Orithostella
Ornatanomalina
Orthella
Orthokarstenia
Orthomorphina
Orthotrinacria
Orthovertella
Oryctoderma
Osangularia
Ovalveolina
Oxinoxis
Ozawainella
Ozourina

P

Paalzowella
Pachyphloia
Pachythurammina
Pacinonion
Palachemonella
Palaeobigenerina
Palaeofusulina
Palaeolituonella
Palaeomiliolina
Palaeoreichelina
Palaeospiroplectammina
Palaeostaffella
Palaeotextularia
Paleodictyoconus
Paleogaudryina
Paleopatellina
Paleopolymorphina
Pallaimorphina
Palliolatella
Palmerinella
Palmula
Palorbitolina
Palorbitolinoides
Pamirina
Pandaglandulina
Pannellaina
Paracaligella
Paracassidulina
Paracoskinolina
Paracyclammina
Paradagmarita
Paradainella
Paradoxiella
Paradunbarula
Paraendothyra
Paraeofusulina
Parafissurina
Parafrondicularia
Parafusulina
Parafusulinella
Paragaudryina
Paraglobivalvulina
Paraglobivalvulinoides
Paragloborotalia
Paralabamina
Paralingulina
Parananlingella
Paraophthalmidium
Paraplectogyra
Parareichelina
Pararotalia
Paraschwagerina
Parasorites
Parasubbotina
Parastegnammina
Paratextularia
Parathurammina
Parathuramminites
Paratikhinella
Paratriasina
Paratrochamminoides
Paravulvulina
Parawelekindellina
Parinvolutina
Parphia
Parrellina
Parrelloides
Partisania
Parurgonina
Parvularugoglobigerina
Pastrikella
Patellina
Patellinella
Patellovalvulina
Paulbronnimannella
Paulina
Pavlovecina
Pavonina
Pavoninoides
Pavonitina
Pavopsammia
Pealerina
Pegidia
Pellatispira
Pellatispirella
Pelosina
Peneroplis
Penoperculoides
Percultazonaria
Periloculina
Permodiscus
Pernerina
Perouvianella
Petchorina
Pfenderella
Pfendericonus
Pfenderina
Phenacophragma
Piallina
Picounina
Pijpersia
Pilammina
Pilamminella
Pinaria
Pisolina
Pityusina
Placentammina
Placopsilina
Plagioraphe
Plagiostomella
Planiinvoluta
Planispirillina
Planispirina
Planispirinella
Planoarchaediscus
Planoendothyra
Planoglabratella
Planoglobulina
Planogypsina
Planolinderina
Planomalina
Planomiliola
Planopulivinulina
Planorbulina
Planorbulinella
Planorotalites
Planospirodiscus
Planularia
Planulina
Planulinoides
Platysolenites
Plecanium
Plectina
Plectinella
Plectofrondicularia
Plectofusulina
Plectogyranopsis
Plectomediocris
Plectomillerella
Plectorecurvoides
Plectotrochammina
Pleuroskelidion
Pleurostomella
Pleurostomelloides
Plummerinella
Plummerita
Podolia
Pohlia
Pojarkovella
Polychasmina
Polydiexodina
Polylepidina
Polymorphina
Polymorphinella
Polyperibola
Polystomellina
Polytaxis
Popovia
Poroarticulina
Poroeponides
Porosorotalia
Porticulasphaera
Postendothyra
Postrugoglobigerina
Praealveolina
Praeammoastuta
Praebulimina
Praebullalveolina
Praechrysalidina
Praecystammina
Praedictyorbitolina
Praeglobobulimina
Praeglobotruncana
Praehedbergella
Praekaraisella
Praekurnubia
Praelacazina
Praemurica
Praeophthalmidium
Praeorbitolina
Praeorbulina
Praeparafusulina
Praepeneroplis
Praepseudofusulina
Praereticulinella
Praerhapydionina
Praesiderolites
Praestorrsella
Pragsoconulus
Pravitoschwagerina
Pravoslavlevia
Presumatrina
Primoriina
Priscella
Prismatomorpha
Pristinosceptrella
Procerolagena
Prodentalina
Profusulinella
Proninella
Prosphaeroidinella
Protelphidium
Protentella
Protoglobobulimina
Protonodosaria
Protopeneroplis
Protriticites
Proxifrons
Psammatodendron
Psamminopelta
Psammolingulina
Psammophax
Psammosphaera
Pseudastrorhiza
Pseudedomia
Pseudoammodiscus
Pseudobaisalina
Pseudobolivina
Pseudobradyina
Pseudobroeckinella
Pseudobulimina
Pseudobulminella
Pseudocassidulinoides
Pseudochernyshinella
Pseudochoffatella
Pseudochrysalidina
Pseudocibicides
Pseudoclavulina
Pseudocylammina
Pseudodoliolina
Pseudoendothyra
Pseudoepistominella
Pseudoeponides
Pseudofabularia
Pseudofissurina
Pseudofrondicularia
Pseudofusulina
Pseudofusulinella
Pseudogaudryina
Pseudogaudryinella
Pseudogavelinella
Pseudogloborotalia
Pseudoglomospira
Pseudoguembelina
Pseudohastigerina
Pseudohaureina
Pseudohelenina
Pseudohyperammina
Pseudokahlerina
Pseudolacazina
Pseudolamarckina
Pseudolepidina
Pseudolituonella
Pseudolituotuba
Pseudolituotubella
Pseudomarssonella
Pseudomphalocyclus
Pseudonodosaria
Pseudononion
Pseudonovella
Pseudoolina
Pseudopalmula
Pseudoparrella
Pseudopatellinella
Pseudopatellinoides
Pseudopfenderina
Pseudophragmina
Pseudoplanoendothyra
Pseudoplanoglobulina
Pseudoplanulinella
Pseudopolymorphina
Pseudopolymorphinoides
Pseudorbitoides
Pseudorbitolina
Pseudoreichelina
Pseudoreophax
Pseudorhapydionina
Pseudorhipidionina
Pseudorotalia
Pseudoruttenia
Pseudosaracenaria
Pseudoschwagerina
Pseudosiderolites
Pseudosigmoilina
Pseudosiphonella
Pseudosolenina
Pseudospirocyclina
Pseudostaffella
Pseudotaxis
Pseudotextularia
Pseudotextulariella
Pseudotribrachia
Pseudotriloculina
Pseudotriplasia
Pseudotristix
Pseudotriticites
Pseudouvigerina
Pseudovidalina
Pseudowanganella
Pseudowedekindellina
Pseudowoodella
Psilocitharella
Pterammina
Ptychocladia
Pullenia
Pulleniatina
Pullenoides
Pulsiphonina
Punctobolivinella
Putrella
Pygmaeoseistron
Pyramidina
Pyramidulina
Pyrenina
Pyrgo
Pyrgoella
Pyrulina
Pyrulinoides
Pytine

Q

Qataria
Quadratobuliminella
Quadrimorphina
Quadrimorphinella
Quasibolivinella
Quasiborelis
Quasicyclammina
Quasiendothyra
Quasifusulina
Quasifusulinoides
Quasiiregularina
Quasilituotuba
Quasirotalia
Quasispiroplectammina
Quasiverbeekina
Queraltina
Quinqueloculina
Quydatella

R

Raadshoovenia
Rabanitina
Racemiguembelina
Radiocyclopeus
Radotruncana
Raibosammina
Ramovsia
Ramulina
Ramulinella
Ranikothalia
Raphconilia
Rauserella
Rauserina
Rectoavesmella
Rectobolivina
Rectobulimina
Rectochernyshinella
Rectocibicides
Rectocornuspira
Rectocyclammia
Rectodictyoconus
Rectoelphidiella
Rectoendothyra
Rectoepistominoides
Rectoeponides
Rectoglomospira
Rectomillerella
Rectoseptaglomospirane
Rectoseptatournayella
Rectostipulina
Rectotournayellina
Rectuvigerina
Recurvoides
Recurvoidella
Redmondina
Reedella
Reichelina
Reichelinella
Reinholdella
Reissella
Reitlingerina
Remesella
Renulina
Reophacella
Reophax
Repmanina
Resigia
Reticulinella
Reticulogyra
Reticulopalmula
Reticulophragmium
Reticulophragmoides
Reusella
Reussoolina
Rhabdammina
Rhabdorbitoides
Rhapydionina
Rhenothyra
Rhizammina
Rhodanopeza
Rhodesinella
Rhombobolivinella
Rimalina
Ripacubana
Riveroinella
Riyadhella
Robertina
Robertinoides
Robuloides
Robulus
Robustopachyphloia
Robustoschwagerina
Roglicia
Rolfina
Rosalina
Rotalia
Rotaliatina
Rotaliatinopsis
Rotalidium
Rotalinoides
Rotalipora
Rotamorphina
Rothina
Ruakituria
Ruatoria
Rugobolivinella
Rugoglobigerina
Rugosochusenella
Rugososchwagerina
Rugotruncana
Rupertina
Russiella
Rutherfordoides
Ryadhella
Rzehakina

S

Sabaudia
Sabellovoluta
Sabulina
Saccammina
Saccamminoides
Saccamminopsis
Saccarena
Sacchararena
Saccorhina
Saccorhiza
Sagenina
Sagoplecta
Sagrina
Sagrinopsis
Saidovina
Sakesaria
Sakhiella
Salpingthurammina
Saltovskajina
Sanderella
Sansabaina
Saracenaria
Saracenella
Saraswati
Satorina
Saudia
Scandonea
Scarificatina
Schackoina
Schackoinella
Scheibnerova
Scherochorella
Schlosserina
Schlumbergerella
Schmidita
Schubertella
Schwagerina
Sculptobaculites
Scyphocodon
Scythiloculina
Seabrookia
Semiendothyra
Semiinvoluta
Seminovella
Semirosalina
Semitextularia
Semivalvulina
Senalveolina
Septabrunsiina
Septaforschia
Septagathammina
Septatournayella
Septigerina
Serovaina
Serpenulina
Serpulopsis
Sestronophora
Shanita
Shastrina
Shengella
Sherbornina
Shouguania
Shuguria
Sichotenella
Siculocosta
Siderolites
Sieberina
Sigalia
Sigalitruncana
Sigmavirgulina
Sigmella
Sigmoidella
Sigmoihauerina
Sigmoilina
Sigmoilinita
Sigmoilopsis
Sigmomorphina
Silicomassilina
Silicosigmoilina
Silicotuba
Silvestriella
Simionescella
Simobaculites
Simplalveolina
Simplorbites
Simplorbitolina
Sinzowella
Siphogaudryina
Siphogenerina
Siphogenerinoides
Siphoglobulina
Sipholagena
Siphonaperta
Siphonides
Siphonina
Siphoninella
Siphoninoides
Siphonodosaria
Siphonofera
Siphonoscutula
Siphotextularia
Siphouvigerina
Sirtina
Sitella
Sivasella
Skinnerina
Smoutina
Sogdianina
Somalina
Soriella
Sorites
Sornayina
Sorosphaera
Sorosphaerella
Sorostomasphaera
Spandelinoides
Sphaerogypsina
Sphaeroidina
Sphaeroidinella
Sphaeroidinellopsis
Sphaeroschwagerina
Sphaerulina
Spinobrunsiina
Spinochernella
Spinodiscorbis
Spinoendothyra
Spinolaxina
Spinothyra
Spinotournayella
Spiraloconulus
Spirapertolina
Spiriamphorella
Spirillina
Spirobolivina
Spiroclypeus
Spirocyclina
Spirofrondicularia
Spirolina
Spirolingulina
Spiroloculina
Spiroloxostoma
Spiroplecta
Spiroplectammina
Spiroplectina
Spiroplectinata
Spiroplectinella
Spiropsammia
Spirosigmoilina
Spirosigmoilinella
Spirosolenites
Spirotecta
Spirotrocholina
Sporadotrema
Sporobulimina
Sporobuliminella
Staffella
Stainforthia
Stedumia
Stegnammina
Steinetella
Stellarticulina
Stenocyclina
Stensioina
Stetsonia
Stichocassidulina
Stichocibicides
Stilostomella
Stomasphaera
Stomatorbina
Stomatostoecha
Stomoloculina
Storrsella
Storthosphaera
Streptalveolina
Streptochilus
Streptocyclammina
Striataella
Strictocostella
Strigialifusus
Subalveolina
Subbdelloidina
Subbotina
Sublamarckella
Suggrunda
Sulcoperculina
Sulcorbitoides
Sumatrina
Svenia
Svratkina
Syzranella
Syzrania

T

Taberina
Taitzehoella
Takayanagia
Talimuella
Talpinella
Tappanella
Tappanina
Tasmanammina
Tayamaia
Technitella
Tenisonina
Tennuitella
Tentifrons
Tentilenticulina
Tergrigorjanzaella
Testacarinata
Tetragonulina
Tetraminouxia
Tetrataxis
Tewoella
Textularia
Textulariella
Textulariopsis
Textulina
Tezaquina
Thailandina
Thalamophaga
Thalmannammina
Thalmannita
Thekammina
Tholosina
Thomasinella
Thompsonella
Thurammina
Thuramminoides
Thuramminopsis
Ticinella
Tikhinella
Timanella
Timidonella
Tinophodella
Tiphotrocha
Tobolia
Tollmannia
Tolypammina
Topalodiscorbis
Torinosuella
Toriyamaia
Torreina
Torremiroella
Torresina
Tortaguttus
Tortonella
Torulumbonina
Tosaia
Tournarchaediscus
Tournayella
Tournayellina
Trachelinella
Transversigerina
Tremachora
Trepeilopsis
Tretomphalus
Triadodiscus
Triasina
Tribrachia
Tricarinella
Trichohylas
Trifarina
Triloculina
Triloculinella
Triloculinoides
Triloculinopsis
Trinitella
Triplasia
Trispirina
Tristix
Tritaxia
Tritaxilina
Triticites
Tritubulogenerina
Trochammina
Trochamminoides
Trochamminula
Trochospira
Trochospirillina
Trochulina
Trochylina
Truncorotalia
Truncorotaloides
Tschokrakella
Tubeporella
Tubeporina
Tuberendothyra
Tuberitina
Tubinella
Tubispirodiscus
Tuborecta
Tubulogenerina
Turborotalia
Turborotalita
Turcmeniella
Turkmenella
Turrilina
Turrispirillina
Turrispiroides
Turritellella

U

Unicosiphonia
Unitendina
Uralinella
Uralodiscus
Uralofusulinella
Urbanella
Urgonina
Urnulinella
Usbekistania
Uslonia
Uviella
Uvigerina
Uvigerinammina
Uvigerinella

V

Vacuovalvulina
Vaginulina
Vaginulinopsis
Valdanchella
Valserina
Valvalabamina
Valvoreussella
Valvulammina
Valvulina
Valvulinella
Valvulineria
Valvulinoides
Vandenbroeckia
Vanderbeekia
Vania
Varidentella
Variostoma
Vasicekia
Vasicostella
Vasiglobulina
Vaughanina
Velapertina
Vellaena
Ventilabrella
Ventrostoma
Verbeekina
Vercorsella
Verella
Verneuilina
Verneuilinella
Verneuilinoides
Vernonina
Verseyella
Vialovella
Vialovia
Vicinesphaera
Victoriella
Vidalina
Vinelloidea
Virgulinella
Virguloides
Virgulopsis
Viseidiscus
Viseina
Vissariotaxis
Vitriwebbina
Voloshinoides
Voloshinovella
Vostokovella
Vulvulina

W

Wadella
Waeringella
Walterparria
Warnantella
Washitella
Webbinella
Webbinelloidea
Wedekindellina
Wellmanella
Wheelerella
Whiteinella
Wiesnerina
Wilfordia
Woodella
Woodringina
Wutuella

X

Xenostaffella
Xintania

Y

Yabeina
Yaberinella
Yangchienia
Yaucorotalia
Yneziella

Z

Zarodella
Zeaflorilus
Zeauvigerina
Zelamarckina
Zellerina
Zellia
Ziguiella
Zotheculifida

Sources
 World Foraminifera Database
 Journal of Foraminiferal Research, Cushman Foundation
 Loeblich & Tappin, 1964. Treatise on Invertebrate Paleontology, Part C

See also
 Protists in the fossil record

Foraminiferans
 List